Pthirus is a genus of lice. There are only two extant species, and they are the sole known members of the family Pthiridae. Pthirus gorillae infests gorillas, and Pthirus pubis afflicts humans, and is commonly known as the crab louse or pubic louse. The two species diverged some 3.3 million years ago.

Since 1958 the generic name Pthirus has been spelled with pth rather than phth, despite this being based on a misspelling of the Greek-derived phthirus.

References

External links 
 

Lice
Parasitic arthropods of mammals
Parasitic infestations, stings, and bites of the skin